Birch Lake is a lake in Fairbanks North Star Borough, Alaska. The lake contains Arctic char, Arctic grayling, Chinook salmon, coho salmon, and rainbow trout and has been stocked extensively since 1966. It is a popular spot for both fishing from boats and ice fishing in the winter.

Recreation site
Birch Lake State Recreation Site is a  state park on the shores of Birch Lake. It features a small campground, boat launch, and swimming and picnic areas. Immediately adjacent to it is a military recreation site operated by the Air Force.

References

Fairbanks North Star Borough, Alaska
Lakes of Alaska
State parks of Alaska